"Move" is the second single from Thousand Foot Krutch's third studio album, The Art of Breaking. Although "Move" received less Christian radio play than the first single, "Absolute", it did receive more mainstream radio play than "Absolute"; because of this, "Move" received a music video. "Move" charted at No. 16 on the Billboard charts.

Music video 

In the video, the band is shown playing in the cellar of an abandoned building. Also shown is a girl, who starts running once the song kicks in. The girl repeatedly bumps into various people and eventually ends up near where the band is playing. She then retraces her steps and finds that most of the people she ran into before now have some sort of metal implant. The audio in the video slightly varies from the album version.  The difference is that in the beginning on the CD McNevan can be heard whispering in the song, but in the video he cannot. Also the chorus at the end of the song, in the video, is not repeated as often as it is in the CD version.

The video was directed by Brandon Dickerson and produced by Erik Press.

Single

Charts

Awards

The song was nominated for a Dove Award for Short Form Music Video of the Year at the 37th GMA Dove Awards.

References

2005 singles
2005 songs
Thousand Foot Krutch songs
Tooth & Nail Records singles
Nu metal songs
Song articles with missing songwriters